In shopping mall design, the Gruen transfer (also known as the Gruen effect) is the moment when consumers enter a shopping mall or store and, surrounded by an intentionally confusing layout, lose track of their original intentions, making them more susceptible to making impulse buys. It is named after Austrian architect Victor Gruen, who disapproved of such manipulative techniques.

Description
The Gruen transfer is a psychological phenomenon in which an idealised hyper-reality is realized by deliberate reconstruction, providing a sense of safety and calm through exceptional familiarity.

In a speech in London in 1978, Victor Gruen disavowed shopping mall developments as having "bastardised" his ideas:  "I refuse to pay alimony for those bastard developments."

References in other media
A television program on Australia's ABC TV network, called The Gruen Transfer, is named after the effect. The program discusses the methods, science and psychology behind advertising.

History 

In 1952, Dayton Company commissioned Victor Gruen to build the first indoor, climate controlled shopping mall, Southdale Center, in Edina, Minnesota. Southdale Center held its grand opening in 1956.

Shopping malls became very popular from the 1960s on. In many cases they were the only air-conditioned places in a town. Numerous shopping malls opened using similar design features, and were very popular until the 1990s.

References

Shopping mall activities and events
Consumer behaviour
Marketing techniques
Retail processes and techniques